The Multilateral Convention to Implement Tax Treaty Related Measures to Prevent Base Erosion and Profit Shifting, sometime abbreviated BEPS multilateral instrument, is a multilateral convention of the Organisation for Economic Co-operation and Development to combat tax avoidance by multinational enterprises (MNEs) through prevention of Base Erosion and Profit Shifting (BEPS). The BEPS multilateral instrument was negotiated within the framework of the OECD G20 BEPS project and enables countries and jurisdictions to swiftly modify their bilateral tax treaties to implement some of the measures agreed.

The substance of the tax treaty-related BEPS measures (under BEPS Actions 2, 6, 7 and 14) was agreed as part of the Final BEPS Package. Accordingly, the negotiation on the text of the BEPS multilateral instrument was focused on how the BEPS multilateral instrument would need to modify the provisions of bilateral or regional tax agreements in order to implement those BEPS measures.

The BEPS multilateral instrument was adopted on 24 November 2016 and signed on 7 June 2017 by 67 jurisdictions for the first signing ceremony. As of July 2018, 83 jurisdictions have signed the BEPS multilateral instrument, covering more than 1,400 bilateral tax treaties. It entered into force on 1 July 2018, among the first jurisdictions that ratified it.

Functioning
The BEPS multilateral instrument looks to "prevent treaty abuse, improve dispute resolution, prevent the artificial avoidance of permanent establishment status and neutralise the effects of hybrid mismatch arrangements". The BEPS multilateral instrument does not function in the same way as an amending protocol to a single existing treaty, which would directly amend the text of the existing tax treaty. Instead, it applies alongside the existing tax treaties. As stated in the Explanatory Statement of the BEPS multilateral instrument this reflects the ordinary rule of treaty interpretation, as reflected in Article 30(3) of the Vienna Convention on the Law of Treaties, under which an earlier treaty between parties that are also parties to a later treaty will apply only to the extent that its provisions are compatible with those of the later treaty. With one convention, the signatory countries can achieve a work that would have taken decades otherwise.

Consistent with the purpose of the BEPS multilateral instrument, which is to swiftly implement the tax treaty-related BEPS measures, the BEPS multilateral instrument also enables all parties to meet 2 of the 4 minimum standards which were agreed as part of the Final BEPS package.
Given, however, that each of those minimum standards can be satisfied in multiple different ways, and given the broad range of countries and jurisdictions involved in the development of the BEPS multilateral instrument, the BEPS multilateral instrument gives flexibilities with respect to ways of meeting it while remaining consistent with its purpose. The BEPS multilateral instrument also provides flexibility by allowing to opt out of provisions which do not reflect a BEPS minimum standard.

Parties
A list of ratified parties to the convention is shown below (as of November 2022). Of the 100 jurisdictions covered, 79 have deposited their instrument of ratification, approval or acceptance.

See also
Base erosion and profit shifting

References

External links
 Official Page
 Treaty text

Treaties concluded in 2017
Treaties entered into force in 2018
Treaties of Austria
Treaties extended to the Isle of Man
Treaties extended to Jersey
Treaties of New Zealand
Treaties of Poland
Treaties of Serbia
Treaties of Slovenia
Treaties of Sweden
Treaties of the United Kingdom
OECD treaties
International taxation